The Hungarian Fencing Federation ( - MVSZ) is the national organization for fencing in Hungary. It was founded in 1914 and has been affiliated to the International Fencing Federation since 1917. Its headquarters is in Budapest.

Hungary has hosted the World Fencing Championships five times (in 1959, 1975, 1991, 2000, and 2013). The chairman of the Hungarian Fencing Federation is Zsolt Csampa (since 2012).

Current officers 
 President: Zsolt Csampa
 General vice president: Jenő Kamuti
 Vice president: Antal Perczel
 Professional vice president: Lajos Szlovenszky
 Secretary: Pál Polgár

International organizations in Hungary
World Championships:
1926 World Fencing Championships – Budapest
1933 World Fencing Championships – Budapest
1959 World Fencing Championships – Budapest
1975 World Fencing Championships – Budapest
1991 World Fencing Championships – Budapest
2013 World Fencing Championships – Budapest
2019 World Fencing Championships – Budapest

European Championships:
1995 European Fencing Championships – Keszthely
2005 European Fencing Championships – Zalaegerszeg

International achievements

Olympic Games
Accurate as of the conclusion of the 2020 Olympic Games.

Fencing clubs of Hungary

Point classification for Hungarian clubs (2015) 

Sabre

Foil

Épée

Presidents

See also
 Hungarian Fencer of the Year

References

External links 
Magyar Vívó Szövetség (official website)

National federations of the European Fencing Confederation
Fencing
Fencing organizations
Fencing in Hungary
1917 establishments in Hungary
Sports organizations established in 1917